Jewel Shepard (born January 3, 1958) is an American writer, photographer, and actress, best known for her roles in movies such as Party Camp (1987) and Return of the Living Dead (1985).

Life and career
Shepard arrived in California in the early 80s, where she supported herself by working as a stripper in various Los Angeles strip clubs and modeling for car shoots. It was during her time stripping that she met genre filmmaker Dan O'Bannon. After a number of small television roles, Shepard broke into film with H. B. Halicki's The Junkman (1982). Roles in over a dozen B movies followed; including 1985's The Return of the Living Dead, which was directed and written by O'Bannon. In 1992 she capitalized on her "B-girl" status by penning Invasion of the B-Girls, a book of interviews with cult actresses such as Kitten Natividad, Linnea Quigley, Yvette Vickers, Haji, and Mary Woronov.  She has also written for such publications as Premiere, Cosmopolitan, Details, and The Associated Press.

Her autobiography, If I'm So Famous, How Come Nobody's Ever Heard of Me?, detailing some of the less glamorous aspects of film making and her experiences working in adult entertainment, was published in 1996.

Personal life
Shepard has been struggling with invasive breast cancer since 2011, and has been treated with chemotherapy, lymph node removal and a double mastectomy.

Filmography

Film

Television

Music videos

References

External links

American magazine writers
People from Flatbush, Brooklyn
Actresses from New York City
American film actresses
American women writers
American television actresses
American voice actresses
1958 births
Living people
21st-century American women